The 2023 Cork Premier Junior Football Championship is scheduled to be the inaugural staging of the Cork Premier Junior Football Championship. The championship is scheduled to run between July and October 2023.

Team changes

To Championship 
Promoted from the Cork Junior A Football Championship

 Buttevant
 Cobh
 Cullen
 Kilmurry
 Kinsale
 St James'
 St. Michael's
 Urhan

Relegated from the Cork Intermediate A Football Championship

 Ballydesmond
 Millstreet
 St. Finbarr's
 St. Nicholas'

Participating teams

Knockout stage

Relegation playoff

Quarter-finals

Semi-finals

Final

References

External links
 Cork GAA website

Cork Premier Junior Football Championship
Cork Premier Junior Football Championship